A Ghoul is a mythical creature originating in pre-Islamic Arabia, often described as hideous human-like monster that dwelt in the desert or other secluded locations in order to lure travellers astray. It was not until Antoine Galland translated the Arabian Nights into French that the western idea of Ghoul was introduced. Galland depicted the Ghoul as a monstrous creature that dwelled in cemeteries, feasting upon corpses. This definition of the Ghoul has persisted until modern times, with Ghouls appearing in literature, television and film, as well video games.

Notable examples 

 In J.K. Rowling's Harry Potter series, ghouls are comparatively harmless creatures that live in the homes of wizards, making loud noises and occasionally groaning; a ghoul resides in the attic of the Weasley family's home as the family's pet. Context implies that in the Harry Potter universe, ghouls are closer to animals than human beings. This "innocuous", "somewhat anodyne depiction" in popular children's books "has placed the ghoul at the heart of mainstream film and literature".
While considered "Zombies" by modern standards, the undead monsters of the 1968 film "Night of the Living Dead" are actually ghouls. They are mentioned as ghouls during a news report the characters watch while trapped inside the house. The writer/director, George A. Romero, has also been quoted in an interview as saying "Actually I never called ours zombies. That description appeared in an article in Cahiers du Cinéma. 'They're zombies,' it said. We originally thought of them as ghouls."
 In the Dungeons and Dragons roleplaying game, ghouls are monstrous, undead humans who reek of carrion and were described as being able to paralyze anyone they touch. A ghoul is said to be created on the death of a man or woman who savored the taste of flesh. They not only eat the dead, but also prey on the unwary living. Ghouls can paralyze their victims with a touch, though elves are immune. Aside from the standard variety, a number of other forms, like the abyssal ghoul, exist. These extraplanar versions of the standard ghoul have fiendish characteristics that make them far more formidable than their cousins. The ghast is similar to the ghoul, but is distinguished by its monstrously foul and supernaturally nauseating stench. It is also more powerful than a standard ghoul; even elves can fall victim to a ghast's paralytic touch. It very closely resembles its undead cousins, but is far more deadly and cunning. They are chaotic evil in alignment.
 In the post-apocalyptic Fallout computer game series, ghouls are a fictional race of posthuman beings mutated by radiation. Commentators have found ghouls an iconic and recognizable element of the Fallout media franchise.

References

Topics in popular culture
Ghouls